Ebenezer Bradbury (July 31, 1793 – June 19, 1864)  was a Massachusetts machinist who served as the Treasurer and Receiver-General of Massachusetts and as a member, and the Speaker, of the Massachusetts House of Representatives.

Early life
Bradbury was born in Newburyport, Massachusetts on July 31, 1793.

Massachusetts House of Representatives
Bradbury represented Newburyport, Massachusetts, Essex County, Massachusetts in the Massachusetts House of Representatives.  Bradbury was the Speaker of the Massachusetts House of Representatives in 1847.

Massachusetts Treasurer
Starting in 1849, Bradbury was the Treasurer and Receiver-General of Massachusetts.

Bradbury lived in Newton, Massachusetts.

See also
 68th Massachusetts General Court (1847)

References

1793 births
1864 deaths
Speakers of the Massachusetts House of Representatives
Members of the Massachusetts House of Representatives
Massachusetts Whigs
19th-century American politicians
Politicians from Newburyport, Massachusetts
Politicians from Newton, Massachusetts
State treasurers of Massachusetts